Route 17 Business or Highway 17 Business may refer to:
 I-17 Business (former)
   M-17 Business loop (former)